Alvar or Alwar in Iran may refer to:
 Alvar, Khalkhal, Ardabil Province
 Alvar, Kowsar, Ardabil Province
 Alvar, East Azerbaijan
 Alvar-e Olya, East Azerbaijan Province
 Alvar-e Sofla, East Azerbaijan Province
 Alvar, Isfahan